Urik may refer to:
Urik (river), a river in Irkutsk Oblast, Russia
Urik (rural locality), a rural locality (a selo) in Irkutsk Oblast, Russia
Urik, the Hungarian name for Uric village, Pui Commune, Hunedoara County, Romania